Margaret Jean (Maggie) Eppstein (also published as Margaret J. E. Heinrich) is an American multidisciplinary scholar whose research involves the computational modeling of complex systems in various application domains. She is a professor emerita and research professor of computer science at the University of Vermont.

Education and career
Eppstein is originally from Kalamazoo, Michigan, where her father worked as a research scientist at Upjohn. Her parents built one of the eight Frank Lloyd Wright-designed homes in Kalamazoo. She majored in zoology at Michigan State University, graduating in 1978. She did graduate study in zoology in the early 1980s at the University of Washington and University of Vermont, before switching to computer science, in which she earned a master's degree at the University of Vermont in 1983. She continued at the University of Vermont as a lecturer in computer science, a position she held from 1983 to 2001.

While working at the University of Vermont, she entered graduate study in civil and environmental engineering there in 1993, and completed her Ph.D. in 1997, under the supervision of David E. Dougherty. On completing her Ph.D., she became a research assistant professor in computer science, a year later adding a secondary appointment as research assistant professor of civil and environmental engineering. She became a regular-rank assistant professor of computer science in 2002, and added a secondary appointment as assistant professor of biology in 2005.

She became founding director of the University of Vermont Complex Systems Center in 2006, was tenured as associate professor in 2008, and promoted to full professor in 2014. She chaired the University of Vermont computer science department from 2014 until 2018, when she retired as professor emerita and research professor.

Research
Eppstein's research involves the computational modeling of complex systems in various application domains. It has included
studies of the foraging strategies of antlions,
the use of ground-penetrating radar to measure soil moisture,
the reconstruction of 3d structure from fluorescence,
the prediction of cascading failures in electric power transmission,
and the popularity of plug-in hybrid vehicles.

Her work on fluorescence tomography won the 2004 Sylvia Sorkin Greenfield Award of the American Association of Physicists in Medicine. She has also won several other best paper awards for her publications.

Selected publications

References

External links
Home page

People from Kalamazoo, Michigan
Year of birth missing (living people)
Living people
Complex systems scientists
American computer scientists
American women computer scientists
Michigan State University alumni
University of Vermont alumni
University of Vermont faculty